Biltmore Shoe Store is a historic commercial building located at Biltmore Village, Asheville, Buncombe County, North Carolina.  It was designed by architect Richard Sharp Smith and built about 1900.  It is a small one-story pebbledash finished building with a clipped gable roof and half-timbering.

It was listed on the National Register of Historic Places in 1979.

References

Commercial buildings on the National Register of Historic Places in North Carolina
Commercial buildings completed in 1900
Buildings and structures in Asheville, North Carolina
National Register of Historic Places in Buncombe County, North Carolina